Firozabad district forms one of the western districts of the Indian state of Uttar Pradesh, which has Firozabad city as its district headquarters. The district is a part of the Agra division.

History
The city lies in the cultural region of Braj and was a part of the Surasena Mahajanapada during the Vedic Age. It was subsequently ruled by the bigger kingdoms like the Mauryas, Guptas, Scythians, Kushans, Indo-Greeks before falling into the hands of local Rajput and Jat rulers.

It was named after Firoz Shah Mansab Dar in 1566 during the reign of Mughal Emperor akbar. Tradition holds that while passing through the town on a pilgrimage to Gaya, Raja Todar Mal was attacked by robbers and his possessions stolen. At his request, Akbar sent his Mansabdar Dar Firoz Shah to assist and he landed somewhere near Sukhmalpur ullu. Firoz Shah's tomb and the ruins of Katra Pathanan his residence now known as Mushtaq Manzil provide evidence for the story.

The 1596 gazetteer of Agra and Mathura records that Firozabad was upgraded to a Pargana then given to Nabab Sadulla as a jagir during the reign of Shah jahan (r. 1627–1658). Mr. Peter, a businessman, connected with the East India Company visited the town on 9 August 1632 and found it in good condition. Etawah, Budaun, Mainpuri and Firozabad were all first class mansabdars of the emperor Farrukhsiyar (r. 1713–1719). The estate of the Labhowa Jhala Rajas also worked together with the mughal sultanate to capture many regions in the United Provinces, and by 1680 the Rajas of Labhowa had much of Firozabad district under their control.

Bajirao Peshwa looted Firozabad and Etmadpur in 1737 in the regime of Mohammad Shah. Jat tribesmen from Mahawan attacked Faujdar Hakim Kajim at Firozabad where they killed him on 9 May 1739, then went on to rule Firozabad for 30 years. Gajuddin, Hidayat Vaksh (son of Alamgir II), his nephew and Mirza Baba his son in law, came to Firozabad. Mirza Nabab Khan stayed here until 1782. At the end of 18th century Firozabad was ruled by Himmat Bahadur Gusain with the cooperation of the Raja of Labhowa.

The French Army Chief Marathas D. Wayan established an ordnance factory in Firozabad in November 1794, an event that Thomas Traving mentions in his book Travels in India. Marathas appointed his subadar Lakwadads here who built a fort near the old tehsil. General Lek and General Vellajally attacked Firozabad in 1802. At the beginning of the British regime Firozabad was in the Etawah district and later attached to the Aligarh district. When Sadabad district was created in 1832, Firozabad was made a part of it then later in 1833 the town came under the aegis of  Agra district. In 1847 the lakh business flourished in Firozabad.

In 1857, the freedom–fighting Chauhans of Mainpuri, the Jamidar of Chandwar and the local Malahs all took active parts in the Indian Rebellion. Noted Urdu poet Munir Shikohabadi was sentenced to Kala pani by the ruling East India Company. People from this city took part in the Khilafat Movement,  the Quit India Movement and the Dandi March with some participants jailed. Mahatma Gandhi visited Firozabad 1929 followed by Semant Gandhi in 1935, Pandit Jawaharlal Nehru in 1937 and Netaji Subhas Chandra Bose in 1940. The Firozabad district was established on February 2, 1989 by an executive order passed by the Government of Uttar Pradesh.

Demographics

According to the 2011 census Firozabad district has a population of 2,498,156, roughly equal to the nation of Kuwait or the US state of Nevada. This gives it a ranking of 173rd in India (out of a total of 640). Its population growth rate over the decade 2001-2011 was  21.62%. Firozabad has a sex ratio of 867 females for every 1000 males, and a literacy rate of 74.6%. Scheduled Castes make up 18.97% of the population.

At the time of the 2011 Census of India, 97.03% of the population in the district spoke Hindi and 2.60% Urdu as their first language. The local language of the district is Brajbhasha.

Culture
The city have some popular Hindu temples mainly Vaishno Devi Dham, Kela Devi Temple, Gopal Ashram (Hanuman Temple).
There are many Jain temples in Firozabad including the well-known Chadamilal Jain temple, Shri Shuparshnath Jain Mandir in Gher Khokal (Mahaveer Chowk) and Chandprabhu Jain Mandir in Khidki. The two temples of Gherkhokal and Khidki are approximately 250–300 years old. The old name of Chandwar was taken from the idol of Chandprabhu made at the time of Prithviraj Chauhan. An annual fair was held in Chandwar on October 2 . The Jama Masjid, founded by the 16th century Mughal Emperor Akbar is the oldest mosque.

Notable people
 Banarsidas Chaturvedi
 Totaram Sanadhya
 Anurag Verma
 Rajeshwar Prasad
 Raj Babbar

Education

University
 J.S. University
 F.S. University
 C.L. Jain College

Geography
 The District is connected by rail and bus to major cities.  The nearest Airport is in Agra.

The district borders Etawah district to the north and Mainpuri and Etawah to the east with the Yamuna River forming the southern boundary.  The area of the district accounts for about 0.8 per cent of the total area of Uttar Pradesh and 1.1 per cent its population. Approximately 73.6 percent of people live in rural areas.  Most of the district lies on a plain sloping from north west to south.

Transportation
Firozabad district has good transportation links due to National Highway 19 linking Delhi with Kolkata & Yammuna Express Way passing through it as does the busy railway route from Delhi to Kolkata.

Nearest Airport is in Agra which is a domestic Airport

Nearest Railway station is in the center of Firozabad and one in Tundla named as Tundla Junction.

Local industries
Firozabad has a major glass industry producing products that include glass bangles and glass hardware so it is also known as Suhag Nagari. Various work is done on bangles in many places known locally as godam.

Villages
 

Nagla Beech

References

External links 

 Official website

 
Districts of Uttar Pradesh
1989 establishments in Uttar Pradesh